Doogtoons is a production studio founded and headed by Doug Bresler, best known for its series of "animated celebrity interviews" on the internet. Bresler has been producing short films since 1993, but his cartoons only became widely known after they were released as podcasts beginning October 22, 2005. One of the pioneers of cartoon podcasting, Doogtoons has been featured in several publications, both online and in print, including The Washington Post, BusinessWeek Magazine, Animation Magazine, USA Today, Rolling Stone, and Entertainment Weekly, among others. Doogtoons's cartoons and shorts have also been featured and licensed by numerous television networks, including Cinemax, Fox Sports, Game Show Network, G4TV and G4 Canada.

TV and web series

Nick and Haig 
Doogtoons' first series of cartoons was entitled Nick and Haig and was created using actual voice clips of interviews Bresler had conducted in 2001 with some of his friends. Bresler said his initial intention was to create an animated horror movie, but needed to do something smaller first in order to practice and learn. Bresler then compiled hours upon hours of interviews with his friends, picked what he thought to be the best content, and began animating characters to go along with the dialogue.

"Nick and Haig - Episode" I originally premiered as a seven-minute short film at the UCSB Digital Film Festival on May 23, 2002, but was later cut down into smaller "episodes" for podcasting. In 2006, an episode from the show entitled "The Vice of Human Beans" won first prize in Bolt's "1 Minute Film Festival". This was the show's second award after winning "Best Animated Short" at the 2006 DIY Film Festival in Los Angeles. Later in the year, Bresler signed a deal with G4 television to air Nick and Haig episodes during the station's "Late Night Peep Show" segment starting in May.

Doogtoons Asks A Ninja 
Doogtoons has created seven animated interviews with the "ninja" from Ask a Ninja (which have since received a "Best of the Web 2007" nod from Animation World Network).

In the Studio 
In late 2006, Doogtoons launched their official animated talk show, In the Studio, with animated interviews featuring "Weird Al" Yankovic and comic Tommy Chong. In March 2008, one of the shorts of the series, "Al's Childhood", was awarded Best Animated Video of 2007 by Yahoo.com.

Doogtoons began releasing new animated interviews in August 2010, the first featuring comedian and actor Harland Williams.

Eli's Dirty Jokes 
In late 2006, Doug Bresler signed on with GoPotato.tv to animate and direct a show for their website. Eli's Dirty Jokes, a short-form series of animated adult-themed jokes told by an elderly real-life accountant, was released on YouTube.

In November 2008, Eli's Dirty Jokes was picked up by HBO for exclusive episodes to be broadcast on their Cinemax cable TV network. The first episode of the weekly show premiered November 8, 2008 preceding the network's premiere of Juno (film). The series is the first original internet show ever to be picked up by HBO and broadcast on any of their TV networks.

In March 2010, Eli's Dirty Jokes was nominated for "Best Animated Web Series" by the International Academy of Web Television at the 2010 Streamy Awards.

Stonetown 
In 2012, Bresler signed on with the Kottonmouth Kings to animate Stonetown, a web series based on cartoon characters designed by D-Loc, one of the band's MCs. The series premiered on YouTube on April 20, 2012.

Fight Stories with Urijah Faber 
In August 2013, Bresler signed on with FOX Sports to direct Fight Stories with Urijah Faber, an animated web series hosted by Urijah Faber. The first episode stars comedian Brian Whittaker and the second features comedian Daryl Wright.

On May 13, 2015, Fox Sports premiered the original 2 episodes of "Fight Stories" along with 3 brand new episodes featuring Josh Wolf, Skylar Astin and Mario Lopez in a half-half hour TV special on Fox Sports 1.

Short films

Fredex: The Secret Lives of Robots 
In 2006, Doogtoons contributed a 10-second animated segment to Channel Frederator's compilation short, Fredex: The Secret Lives of Robots, which won Best Internet Film at the 2007 Platform International Animation Festival in Portland, Oregon.

Holding for Miss Kiley 
In August 2009, Doogtoons teamed up with Jonathan Katz to animate a short sketch for his podcast show, Hey, We're Back!.

It Getteth Better 
In October 2011, Doogtoons created an animated featurette for the book The Last Testament: A Memoir, written by David Javerbaum. The video was titled "It Getteth Better".

Music videos

Denny Blaze - Average Homeboy Returns 
Doogtoons' first music video, produced in 2006, features self-proclaimed "Average Homeboy" Denny Blaze.

"Weird Al" Yankovic - Trapped in the Drive-Thru 
In March 2007, Doug Bresler produced and directed a music video for "Weird Al" Yankovic for his track, Trapped in the Drive-Thru. Doogtoons was awarded a gold record for their contribution to Straight Outta Lynwood. The video was also featured as Channel Frederator's 100th episode. In June 2008, Trapped received the award of Funniest Film of 2007 at the Channel Frederator Awards.

Dan May - I Got A Gun 
In September 2012, Doogtoons released a music video for Philadelphia-based singer/songwriter Dan May. I Got A Gun features a comedic spin on the classic fairy tales "The Three Little Pigs" and "Jack and the Beanstalk".

Dirtball and X - Robbery 
In April 2013, Doogtoons released a live-action music video featuring The Dirtball and Daddy X of the Kottonmouth Kings.

L.B. Rayne

Indiana Jones (The Rejected Pop Music Video) 
In July 2008, Doogtoons released a retro song and music video for pop star Laurence Butler Rayne entitled "Indiana Jones". The video, said to be made in the winter of 1984, features the purported "lost theme song" to Indiana Jones and the Temple of Doom.

Skywalking (The Rejected Star Wars Music Video) 
L.B. Rayne's second video, Skywalking, was released October 31, 2009. Said to be produced in 1980, it is being touted as a lost love ballad intended for the soundtrack of The Empire Strikes Back. It is portrayed ironically as a love ballad between Luke Skywalker and Princess Leia, who would be retconned as siblings in 1983's Return of the Jedi.

The Groove Grid (The Rejected TRON Music Video) 
L.B. Rayne's The Groove Grid was released December 29, 2010. It has been advertised as the lost theme song to the 1982 science fiction epic Tron.

Where No Man's Been Before (The Rejected Star Trek Music Video) 
In April 2013, Doogtoons released yet another L.B. Rayne "lost classic" which is said to be the lost theme song to Star Trek II: The Wrath of Khan. The video features "Weird Al" Yankovic as a guitar-shredding Klingon as well as cameos from numerous YouTube personalities including Taryn Southern, Jessica Lizama and Nikki Limo.

Nightmare on L.B. Street (The Rejected Nightmare on Elm Street Music Video 
In October 2013, Doogtoons released L.B. Rayne's lost theme song to "A Nightmare on Elm Street".

Terminate Our Love (The Rejected Terminator Music Video) 
In June 2015, Doogtoons released a L.B. Rayne music video, "Terminate Our Love", the rejected theme song for James Cameron's 1984 sci-fi film The Terminator. The video features Morgan Larson as Sarah Connor and Trevor Algatt as the Terminator, along with other reoccurring L.B. Rayne cast members.

Awards and nominations

List of shorts

Nick and Haig episodes

Doogtoons Asks a Ninja

In the Studio

Video Game Life

Eli's Dirty Jokes

Stonetown

Doogtoons Quickies

Fight Stories with Urijah Faber

Todd's Blog

Todd and Stanley

Music videos

Other collaborations

Other shorts

References

External links
 

Video podcasts
American comedy websites
Internet memes
Internet properties established in 2001
Lists of flash cartoon episodes
G4 (American TV network) original programming
American flash animated web series
American animated web series
2005 podcast debuts 
Comedy and humor podcasts